Berwyn station may refer to:

Berwyn station (CTA), a Chicago "L" station
Berwyn station (Metra), a Metra train station in Berwyn, Illinois, USA
Berwyn station (SEPTA), a SEPTA train station in Berwyn, Pennsylvania, USA
Berwyn railway station in Berwyn, Denbighshire, Wales

See also
Berwyn (disambiguation)